The 1953–54 Cypriot Cup was the 17th edition of the Cypriot Cup. A total of 18 clubs entered the competition. It began on 8 May 1954 with the first preliminary round and concluded on 27 June 1954 with the final which was held at GSP Stadium. Çetinkaya Türk won their 2nd Cypriot Cup trophy after beating Pezoporikos 2–1 in the final.

Format 
In the 1953–54 Cypriot Cup, participated the 9 teams of the Cypriot First Division and the 9 teams of the Cypriot Second Division.

The First Division teams and the two winners of each group of Second Division began from first round. The rest 5 teams of Second Division played three
preliminary rounds and the winner participated to the first round. The draw between the five teams took place so that in the third qualifying round a team from each group would participated.

The competition consisted of seven knock-out rounds. In all rounds each tie was played as a single leg and was held at the home ground of the one of the two teams, according to the draw results. Each tie winner was qualifying to the next round. If a match was drawn, extra time was following. If extra time was drawn, there was a replay match.

First preliminary round

Second preliminary round

Third preliminary round

First round

Quarter-finals

Semi-finals 

1Nea Salamis were the first second division club to reach the semifinals.

Final

Sources

Bibliography

See also 
 Cypriot Cup
 1953–54 Cypriot First Division

Cypriot Cup seasons
1953–54 domestic association football cups
1953–54 in Cypriot football